The Diocese of Belfort–Montbéliard (Latin: Dioecesis Belfortiensis–Montis Beligardi; French: Diocèse de Belfort–Montbéliard) is a Latin Church ecclesiastical territory or diocese of the Catholic Church in France. Erected in November 1979, the diocese was split off from the metropolitan Archdiocese of Besançon and remains a suffragan diocese in its ecclesiastical province.

Ordinaries
Eugène Georges Joseph Lecrosnier (3 November 1979 – 1 March 2000) 
Claude Pierre Charles Schockert (1 March 2000 – 21 May 2015)
Dominique Blanchet (21 May 2015 – 9 January 2021)
 Denis Jean-Marie Jachiet (2 October 2021-)

See also
Catholic Church in France

References

External links
 GCatholic.org
 Catholic Hierarchy 

Roman Catholic dioceses in France
1979 establishments in France